Ngawa may refer to:

Ngawa Tibetan and Qiang Autonomous Prefecture, in Sichuan, China
Ngawa County, in Ngawa Prefecture
Ngawa Town, seat of Ngawa County
Ngawa Island, Solomon Islands